Kanagaratnam Shanmugaratnam (2 April 1921 – 28 July 2018) was a Singaporean pathologist who established the Singapore Cancer Registry (SCR) in 1967. Shanmugaratnam was considered to be Singapore's "father of pathology" while being a respected expert on nasopharyngeal carcinoma. He was the father of Senior Minister Tharman Shanmugaratnam

Career

Death

He died on 28 July 2018, aged 97, at his home in Singapore.

Personal life

He was the father of Senior Minister of Singapore, Tharman Shanmugaratnam.

References 

1921 births
2018 deaths
Singaporean pathologists